The Canadian Institute of Technology (CIT) is a for-profit university college located in Tirana, Albania. It is known to offer Bachelor and Master programs, entirely in English, divided into two faculties, the two faculties being the Faculty of Engineering and the Faculty of Economy. Its curriculum is based on the Canadian curriculum.

History and organisation
The Canadian Institute of Technology (CIT) was established on November 10, 2011. Its philosophy aims at providing potential students with the necessary and competitive skills required by the Albanian and Balkan region as well as the European and North American labor markets.

It is organised in two faculties, the Faculty of Engineering which is composed of these units:
 Department of Software Engineering 
 Department of Industrial Engineering 
 Scientific Research Unit “CIRD Engineering”

And the Faculty of Economy which is composed of these units:
 Department of Business Administration
 Department of Business Administration and Information Technology
 Scientific Research Unit “CIRD Economy”

It also received accreditation on March 25, 2016.

Mission
CIT has as its mission the development of students' individual skills and abilities, promotion of competition and improvement of education by appreciating and respecting cultural diversity and values of Albania.

References

Education in Tirana
Universities in Albania
Engineering universities and colleges
For-profit universities and colleges in Europe
2011 establishments in Albania
Educational institutions established in 2011
Buildings and structures in Tirana